Ulf Prange (born 25 July 1975 in Oldenburg) is a German lawyer and politician in the SPD and a member of Parliament in the state of Lower Saxony.

External links 

 Website von Ulf Prange
 Website von Rechtsanwalt Ulf Prange

References 

Jurists from Lower Saxony
Members of the Landtag of Lower Saxony
People from Oldenburg (city)
1975 births
Living people